Eurymedon may refer to:

Historical figures 
Eurymedon (strategos) (died 413 BC), one of the Athenian generals (strategoi) during the Peloponnesian War
Eurymedon of Myrrhinus, married Plato's sister, Potone; he was the father of Speusippus
Eurymedon the hierophant, the representative of  Eleusinian Demetra; together with the school of Isocrates and Demophilos they brought a charge of impiety against Aristotle

Greek mythology 
Eurymedon (mythology)

Geography 
Eurymedon River, now Köprüçay River
Eurymedon Bridge (Aspendos), over this river at Aspendos
Eurymedon Bridge (Selge), over this river at Selge

Other uses 
5012 Eurymedon, asteroid
The Eurymedon, alternative name for New Zealand Shipping Co. Ltd. v. A. M. Satterthwaite & Co. Ltd. court case
Eurymedon vase, an Attic red-figure oinochoe, a wine jug attributed to the circle of the Triptolemos Painter made ca. 460 BC, which is now in the Museum für Kunst und Gewerbe Hamburg (1981.173)

See also 
Battle of the Eurymedon (466 BC), a double battle, taking place both on water and land, between the Delian League of Athens and her Allies, and the Persian Empire of Xerxes I
Battle of the Eurymedon (190 BC), fought in 190 BC (approximate coordinates: 36°49'00"N, 31°10'20"E) between a Seleucid fleet and the navy of the city state of Rhodes, who were allied with the Roman Republic